Roberto José Aballay (born 22 November 1922) is an Argentine former football player who played as a striker.

Aballay started his career in 1940 for River Plate, Banfield and San Lorenzo de Almagro. He played also in Mexico for Asturias winning the championship title in the 1943-44 season, he was also the league's top goalscorer with 40 goals in 24 games. He was awarded the 1945 CONCACAF player of the year award for 1945

In Italy for Genoa in season 1949-50 (played 29 matches and scored 3 goals) and in France where closed career in 1950s with FC Nancy, Metz and MC Alger in Algeria.

References 

1922 births
Living people
Footballers from Buenos Aires
Argentine expatriate footballers
Argentine footballers
Association football forwards
Club Atlético River Plate footballers
Argentinos Juniors footballers
Club Atlético Banfield footballers
San Lorenzo de Almagro footballers
Serie A players
Genoa C.F.C. players
Expatriate footballers in Italy
Expatriate footballers in France
Expatriate footballers in Mexico
FC Metz players
Ligue 1 players
Argentine Primera División players
Liga MX players
Argentine expatriate sportspeople in France
Argentine expatriate sportspeople in Italy
Argentine expatriate sportspeople in Mexico
Argentine expatriate sportspeople in Algeria
MC Alger players
FC Nancy players
L.D.U. Quito managers
Argentine football managers
Expatriate footballers in Algeria
Deportes Tolima managers